Ali Kandi (also Romanized as ‘Alī Kandī and ‘Alīkandī) is a village in Charuymaq-e Jonubegharbi Rural District, in the Central District of Charuymaq County, East Azerbaijan Province, Iran. At the 2006 census, its population was 34, in 5 families.

References 

Populated places in Charuymaq County